Nickolos Edward Gwiazdowski (born December 30, 1992) is an American freestyle wrestler and graduated folkstyle wrestler. A two-time NCAA Division I National Champion for the North Carolina State Wolfpack, Gwiazdowski has won two bronze medals at the World Championships and has captured a Pan American Games title and two Pan American Championships for Team USA.

High school career 
He was a 2 time NYSPHSAA (New York) Division II state champion for Duanesburg High School, where he went 50-0 as a senior, and managed to not have a single opponent go the entire match with him. He received the Dave Schultz and Wade Schalles Awards at the end of the season.

College career 
Nick earned All-American honors as a true freshman at Binghamton University in 2012 (8th at 285). He then transferred to North Carolina State University and redshirted the 2012-13 season to preserve his NCAA eligibility. While there he was then a three-time All-American for the Wolfpack, twice a national champion (2014 & 2015) and once a runner-up (2016), while competing at the 285 lb. heavyweight division. He lost his last match to eventual Olympic gold medalist Kyle Snyder.

International career 
Gwiazdowski competed at the 2017 Wrestling World Cup - Men's freestyle, losing in the take-all final match.

Gwiazdowski qualified for the 2017 World Wrestling Championships at 125 kg by winning the U.S. Team Trials where he was an automatic finalist by being U.S. Open champion.  At the 2017 Worlds, he won a bronze medal.

At the Golden Grand Prix Ivan Yarygin 2018 he lost to Muradin Kushkhov of Russia in the quarterfinals, but went on to wrestle back and win a bronze medal against Lkhagvagerel Munkhtur of Mongolia.

In 2022, he competed at the Yasar Dogu Tournament held in Istanbul, Turkey.

Freestyle record 

! colspan="7"| Senior Freestyle Matches
|-
!  Res.
!  Record
!  Opponent
!  Score
!  Date
!  Event
!  Location
|-
|
|
|align=left| Zach Merrill
|
|style="font-size:88%"|February 13, 2022
|style="font-size:88%"|2022 Bout at the Ballpark
|style="text-align:left;font-size:88%;"|
 Arlington, Texas
|-
! style=background:white colspan=7 |
|-
|Loss 
|116–37
|align=left| Taha Akgül
|style="font-size:88%"|4–6
|style="font-size:88%" rowspan=2|October 3, 2021
|style="font-size:88%" rowspan=4|2021 World Championships
|style="text-align:left;font-size:88%;" rowspan=4| Oslo, Norway
|-
|Win 
|116–36
|align=left| Dzianis Khramiankou
|style="font-size:88%"|6–1
|-
|Loss 
|115–36
|align=left| Amir Hossein Zare
|style="font-size:88%"|TF 0–10
|style="font-size:88%" rowspan=2|October 2, 2021
|-
|Win 
|115–35
|align=left| Amar Dhesi
|style="font-size:88%"|8–3
|-
! style=background:white colspan=7 |
|-
|Win 
|114–35
|align=left| Mason Parris
|style="font-size:88%"|10–3
|style="font-size:88%" rowspan=2|September 12, 2021
|style="font-size:88%" rowspan=4|2021 US World Team Trials
|style="text-align:left;font-size:88%;" rowspan=4| Lincoln, Nebraska
|-
|Win 
|113–35
|align=left| Mason Parris
|style="font-size:88%"|6–0
|-
|Win 
|112–35
|align=left| Jordan Wood
|style="font-size:88%"|9–0
|style="font-size:88%" rowspan=2|September 11, 2021
|-
|Win 
|111–35
|align=left| Demetrius Thomas
|style="font-size:88%"|TF 10–0
|-
! style=background:white colspan=7 |
|-
|Loss
|110–35
|align=left| Amir Hossein Zare
|style="font-size:88%"|DQ (1–6)
|style="font-size:88%" rowspan=3|June 9, 2021
|style="font-size:88%" rowspan=3|2021 Poland Open
|style="text-align:left;font-size:88%;" rowspan=3|
 Warsaw, Poland
|-
|Win
|110–34
|align=left| Youssif Hemida
|style="font-size:88%"|TF 10–0
|-
|Win
|109–34
|align=left| Yusup Batirmurzaev
|style="font-size:88%"|9–2
|-
! style=background:white colspan=7 |
|-
|Win
|108–34
|align=left| Tony Cassioppi
|style="font-size:88%"|TF 12–0
|style="font-size:88%" rowspan=4|May 1–2, 2021
|style="font-size:88%" rowspan=4|2021 US Open National Championships
|style="text-align:left;font-size:88%;" rowspan=4| Coralville, Iowa
|-
|Win
|107–34
|align=left| Christian Lance
|style="font-size:88%"|9–0
|-
|Win
|106–34
|align=left| Matt Stencel
|style="font-size:88%"|TF 10–0
|-
|Win
|105–34
|align=left| Aydin Guttridge
|style="font-size:88%"|TF 10–0
|-
! style=background:white colspan=7 |
|-
|Loss
|104–34
|align=left| Gable Steveson
|style="font-size:88%"|4–10
|style="font-size:88%" rowspan=4|April 2–3, 2021
|style="font-size:88%" rowspan=4|2020 US Olympic Team Trials
|style="text-align:left;font-size:88%;" rowspan=4| Fort Worth, Texas
|-
|Loss
|104–33
|align=left| Gable Steveson
|style="font-size:88%"|TF 0–10
|-
|Win
|104–32
|align=left| Dom Bradley
|style="font-size:88%"|TF 11–0
|-
|Win
|103–32
|align=left| Garrett Ryan
|style="font-size:88%"|TF 11–0
|-
! style=background:white colspan=7 | 
|-
|Win
|102–32
|align=left| Asghar Laghari
|style="font-size:88%"|TF 10–0
|style="font-size:88%" rowspan=3|January 16–17, 2021
|style="font-size:88%" rowspan=3|Grand Prix de France Henri Deglane 2021
|style="text-align:left;font-size:88%;" rowspan=3|
 Nice, France
|-
|Loss
|101–32
|align=left| Robert Baran
|style="font-size:88%"|5–5
|-
|Win
|101–31
|align=left| Jere Heino
|style="font-size:88%"|TF 11–0
|-
! style=background:white colspan=7 |
|-
|Loss
|100–31
|align=left| Mason Parris
|style="font-size:88%"|7–10
|style="font-size:88%" rowspan=4|December 4–5, 2020
|style="font-size:88%" rowspan=4|FloWrestling RTC Cup
|style="text-align:left;font-size:88%;" rowspan=4|
 Austin, Texas
|-
|Win
|100–30
|align=left| Amar Dhesi
|style="font-size:88%"|TF 11–0
|-
|Loss
|99–30
|align=left| Gable Steveson
|style="font-size:88%"|1–4
|-
|Win
|99–29
|align=left| Mason Parris
|style="font-size:88%"|TF 18–8
|-
|Win
|98–29
|align=left| Kyven Gadson
|style="font-size:88%"|TF 10–0
|style="font-size:88%"|August 30, 2020
|style="font-size:88%"|Chael Sonnen's Wrestling Underground I
|style="text-align:left;font-size:88%;" |
 United States
|-
! style=background:white colspan=7 |
|-
|Win
|97–29
|align=left| Amar Dhesi
|style="font-size:88%"|FF
|style="font-size:88%" rowspan=2|March 15, 2020
|style="font-size:88%" rowspan=2|2020 Pan American Olympic Qualification Tournament
|style="text-align:left;font-size:88%;" rowspan=2|
 Ottawa, Canada
|-
|Win
|96–29
|align=left| Luis Vivenes
|style="font-size:88%"|TF 10–0
|-
! style=background:white colspan=7 | 
|-
|Win
|95–29
|align=left| Etienne Wyrich
|style="font-size:88%"|TF 16–0
|style="font-size:88%"|January 18, 2020
|style="font-size:88%"|2019–2020 Deutsche Ringerliga season
|style="text-align:left;font-size:88%;"|
 Germany
|-
! style=background:white colspan=7 |
|-
|Loss
|94–29
|align=left| Amir Hossein Zare
|style="font-size:88%"|TF 0–10
|style="font-size:88%" rowspan=3|December 7–8, 2019
|style="font-size:88%" rowspan=3|2019 Alans International
|style="text-align:left;font-size:88%;" rowspan=3|
 Vladikavkaz, Russia
|-
|Win
|94–28
|align=left| Khasan Khubaev
|style="font-size:88%"|8–6
|-
|Loss
|93–28
|align=left| Batradz Gazzaev
|style="font-size:88%"|2–9
|-
|Loss
|93–27
|align=left| Zelimkhan Khizriev
|style="font-size:88%"|7–7
|style="font-size:88%"|November 24, 2019
|style="font-size:88%" rowspan=2|2019–2020 Deutsche Ringerliga season
|style="text-align:left;font-size:88%;" rowspan=2|
 Germany
|-
|Win
|93–26
|align=left| Marco Becker
|style="font-size:88%"|TF 16–0
|style="font-size:88%"|November 23, 2019
|-
! style=background:white colspan=7 |
|-
|Loss
|92–26
|align=left| Yadollah Mohebbi
|style="font-size:88%"|2–5
|style="font-size:88%" |September 20, 2019 
|style="font-size:88%" |2019 World Championships
|style="text-align:left;font-size:88%;" |
 Nur-Sultan, Kazakhstan
|-
! style=background:white colspan=7 |
|-
|Win
|92–25
|align=left| Óscar Pino
|style="font-size:88%"|TF 10–0
|style="font-size:88%" rowspan=3|August 10, 2019
|style="font-size:88%" rowspan=3|2019 Pan American Games
|style="text-align:left;font-size:88%;" rowspan=3|
 Lima, Peru
|-
|Win
|91–25
|align=left| Korey Jarvis
|style="font-size:88%"|TF 10–0
|-
|Win
|90–25
|align=left| Andrew Gunning
|style="font-size:88%"|TF 10–0
|-
! style=background:white colspan=7 |
|-
|Loss
|89–25
|align=left| Taha Akgül
|style="font-size:88%"|1–5
|style="font-size:88%" rowspan=3|July 11–14, 2019
|style="font-size:88%" rowspan=3|2019 Yasar Dogu
|style="text-align:left;font-size:88%;" rowspan=3|
 Istanbul, Turkey
|-
|Win
|89–24
|align=left| Sumit Sumit
|style="font-size:88%"|6–2
|-
|Win
|88–24
|align=left| Fatih Çakıroğlu
|style="font-size:88%"|FF
|-
! style=background:white colspan=7 |
|-
|Win
|87–24
|align=left| Gable Steveson
|style="font-size:88%"|3–3
|style="font-size:88%" rowspan=2|June 7–8, 2019
|style="font-size:88%" rowspan=2|2019 Final X: Rutgers
|style="text-align:left;font-size:88%;" rowspan=2|
 New Brunswick, New Jersey
|-
|Win
|86–24
|align=left| Gable Steveson
|style="font-size:88%"|4–4
|-
|Win
|85–24
|align=left| Derek White
|style="font-size:88%"|9–0
|style="font-size:88%"|May 6, 2019
|style="font-size:88%"|2019 Beat the Streets: Grapple at the Garden
|style="text-align:left;font-size:88%;" |
 New York City, New York
|-
! style=background:white colspan=7 |
|-
|Win
|84–24
|align=left| Korey Jarvis
|style="font-size:88%"|TF 10–0
|style="font-size:88%" rowspan=4|April 1, 2019 
|style="font-size:88%" rowspan=4|2019 Pan American Championships
|style="text-align:left;font-size:88%;" rowspan=4|
 Buenos Aires, Argentina
|-
|Win
|83–24
|align=left| Óscar Pino
|style="font-size:88%"|TF 11–1
|-
|Win
|82–24
|align=left| Eduardo García
|style="font-size:88%"|TF 10–0
|-
|Win
|81–24
|align=left| Marcos Santos 
|style="font-size:88%"|TF 10–0
|-
! style=background:white colspan=7 |
|-
|Loss
|80–24
|align=left| Deng Zhiwei
|style="font-size:88%"|5–7
|style="font-size:88%" rowspan=4|February 28 – March 3, 2019
|style="font-size:88%" rowspan=4|2019 Dan Kolov - Nikola Petrov Memorial
|style="text-align:left;font-size:88%;" rowspan=4|
 Ruse, Bulgaria
|-
|Loss
|80–23
|align=left| Parviz Hadi
|style="font-size:88%"|2–5
|-
|Win
|80–22
|align=left| Fatih Çakıroğlu 
|style="font-size:88%"|6–0
|-
|Win
|79–22
|align=left| Robert Baran
|style="font-size:88%"|5–1
|-
! style=background:white colspan=7 | 
|-
|Win
|78–22
|align=left| Magomedgadzhi Nurasulov
|style="font-size:88%"|5–4
|style="font-size:88%"|January 12, 2019
|style="font-size:88%" rowspan=4|2018–2019 Deutsche Ringerliga season
|style="text-align:left;font-size:88%;" rowspan=4|
 Germany
|-
|Win
|77–22
|align=left| Giorgi Sakandelidze
|style="font-size:88%"|3–2
|style="font-size:88%"|December 8, 2018
|-
|Win
|76–22
|align=left| Dániel Ligeti
|style="font-size:88%"|TF 16–0
|style="font-size:88%"|December 1, 2018
|-
|Win
|75–22
|align=left| Anzor Khizriev
|style="font-size:88%"|4–2
|style="font-size:88%"|November 10, 2018
|-
! style=background:white colspan=7 |
|-
|Win
|74–22
|align=left| Sumit Malik
|style="font-size:88%"|7–2
|style="font-size:88%" rowspan=4|October 20–21, 2018
|style="font-size:88%" rowspan=4|2018 World Championships
|style="text-align:left;font-size:88%;" rowspan=4|
 Budapest, Hungary
|-
|Win
|73–22
|align=left| Amar Dhesi
|style="font-size:88%"|7–0
|-
|Loss
|72–22
|align=left| Deng Zhiwei
|style="font-size:88%"|4–5
|-
|Win
|72–21
|align=left| Natsagsürengiin Zolboo
|style="font-size:88%"|9–4
|-
! style=background:white colspan=7 |
|-
|Win
|71–21
|align=left| Nick Matuhin
|style="font-size:88%"|6–4
|style="font-size:88%" rowspan=4|July 27–29, 2018
|style="font-size:88%" rowspan=4|2018 Yasar Dogu
|style="text-align:left;font-size:88%;" rowspan=4|
 Istanbul, Turkey
|-
|Loss
|70–21
|align=left| Oleksandr Khotsianivskyi
|style="font-size:88%"|3–4
|-
|Win
|70–20
|align=left| Duman Bultrikov 
|style="font-size:88%"|TF 10–0
|-
|Win
|69–20
|align=left| Sumit Sumit
|style="font-size:88%"|TF 10–0
|-
! style=background:white colspan=7 |
|-
|Win
|68–20
|align=left| Adam Coon
|style="font-size:88%"|6–1
|style="font-size:88%" rowspan=2|June 22–23, 2018
|style="font-size:88%" rowspan=2|2018 Final X: Lehigh
|style="text-align:left;font-size:88%;" rowspan=2|
 Bethlehem, Pennsylvania
|-
|Win
|67–20
|align=left| Adam Coon
|style="font-size:88%"|6–1
|-
|Win
|66–20
|align=left| Yudenny Alpajón
|style="font-size:88%"|9–1
|style="font-size:88%"|May 17, 2018
|style="font-size:88%"|2018 Beat the Streets: Team USA vs Cuba
|style="text-align:left;font-size:88%;" |
 New York City, New York
|-
! style=background:white colspan=7 |
|-
|Win
|65–20
|align=left| Yudenny Alpajón
|style="font-size:88%"|9–0
|style="font-size:88%" rowspan=3|May 3–6, 2018 
|style="font-size:88%" rowspan=3|2018 Pan American Championships
|style="text-align:left;font-size:88%;" rowspan=3|
 Lima, Peru
|-
|Win
|64–20
|align=left| Carlos Félix
|style="font-size:88%"|TF 11–0
|-
|Win
|63–20
|align=left| Catriel Muriel
|style="font-size:88%"|TF 10–0
|-
! style=background:white colspan=7 |
|-
|Win
|62–20
|align=left| Lkhagvagerel Munkhtur
|style="font-size:88%"|5–1
|style="font-size:88%" rowspan=4|January 27, 2018
|style="font-size:88%" rowspan=4|Golden Grand Prix Ivan Yarygin 2018
|style="text-align:left;font-size:88%;" rowspan=4|
 Krasnoyarsk, Russia
|-
|Win
|61–20
|align=left| Zhanxiang Hu
|style="font-size:88%"|7–0
|-
|Loss
|60–20
|align=left| Muradin Kushkhov
|style="font-size:88%"|1–3
|-
|Win
|60–19
|align=left| Alan Khugaev
|style="font-size:88%"|6–1
|-
! style=background:white colspan=7 |
|-
|Loss
|59–19
|align=left| Geno Petriashvili
|style="font-size:88%"|5–6
|style="font-size:88%" rowspan=5|December 7–8, 2017 
|style="font-size:88%" rowspan=5|2017 World Clubs Cup
|style="text-align:left;font-size:88%;" rowspan=5|
 Tehran, Iran
|-
|Win
|59–18
|align=left| Mönkhtöriin Lkhagvagerel
|style="font-size:88%"|TF 10–0
|-
|Win
|58–18
|align=left| Mert Emin
|style="font-size:88%"|TF 10–0
|-
|Win
|57–18
|align=left| Pushpender Singh
|style="font-size:88%"|TF 10–0
|-
|Win
|56–18
|align=left| Korey Jarvis
|style="font-size:88%"|TF 10–0
|-
! style=background:white colspan=7 |
|-
|Win
|55–18
|align=left| Natsagsürengiin Zolboo
|style="font-size:88%"|5–1
|style="font-size:88%" rowspan=5|August 25, 2017
|style="font-size:88%" rowspan=5|2017 World Championships
|style="text-align:left;font-size:88%;" rowspan=5|
 Paris, France
|-
|Loss
|54–18
|align=left| Taha Akgül
|style="font-size:88%"|TF 0–10
|-
|Win
|54–17
|align=left| Yadollah Mohebbi
|style="font-size:88%"|5–4
|-
|Win
|53–17
|align=left| Dániel Ligeti
|style="font-size:88%"|10–1
|-
|Win
|52–17
|align=left| Andrei Romanov
|style="font-size:88%"|TF 10–0
|-
! style=background:white colspan=7 |
|-
|Win
|51–17
|align=left| Amin Taheri Jafar
|style="font-size:88%"|5–2
|style="font-size:88%" rowspan=3|July 15–16, 2017
|style="font-size:88%" rowspan=3|2017 Grand Prix of Spain
|style="text-align:left;font-size:88%;" rowspan=3|
 Madrid, Spain
|-
|Win
|50–17
|align=left| Edgardo Lopez
|style="font-size:88%"|TF 10–0
|-
|Win
|49–17
|align=left| Sean Molle
|style="font-size:88%"|TF 14–4
|-
! style=background:white colspan=7 |
|-
|Win
|48–17
|align=left| Dom Bradley
|style="font-size:88%"|3–2
|style="font-size:88%" rowspan=2|June 10, 2017
|style="font-size:88%" rowspan=2|2017 US World Team Trials
|style="text-align:left;font-size:88%;" rowspan=2|
 Lincoln, Nebraska
|-
|Win
|47–17
|align=left| Dom Bradley
|style="font-size:88%"|5–1
|-
|Win
|46–17
|align=left| Katsutoshi Kanazawa
|style="font-size:88%"|TF 11–0
|style="font-size:88%"|May 17, 2017
|style="font-size:88%"|2017 Beat The Streets: Times Square
|style="text-align:left;font-size:88%;" |
 New York City, New York
|-
! style=background:white colspan=7 |
|-
|Win
|45–17
|align=left| Zach Rey
|style="font-size:88%"|3–2
|style="font-size:88%" rowspan=5|April 26–29, 2017
|style="font-size:88%" rowspan=5|2017 US Open National Championships
|style="text-align:left;font-size:88%;" rowspan=5|
 Las Vegas, Nevada
|-
|Win
|44–17
|align=left| Dom Bradley
|style="font-size:88%"|6–4
|-
|Win
|43–17
|align=left| Bobby Telford
|style="font-size:88%"|4–1
|-
|Win
|42–17
|align=left| Daniel Stibral
|style="font-size:88%"|TF 11–0
|-
|Win
|41–17
|align=left| Michael Gregory
|style="font-size:88%"|TF 10–0
|-
! style=background:white colspan=7 |
|-
|Loss
|40–17
|align=left| Komeil Ghasemi
|style="font-size:88%"|0–5
|style="font-size:88%" rowspan=2|February 16–17, 2017 
|style="font-size:88%" rowspan=2|2017 World Cup
|style="text-align:left;font-size:88%;" rowspan=2|
 Kermanshah, Iran
|-
|Loss
|40–16
|align=left| Jamaladdin Magomedov
|style="font-size:88%"|1–3
|-
! style=background:white colspan=7 |
|-
|Loss
|40–15
|align=left| Adlan Ibragimov
|style="font-size:88%"|4–6
|style="font-size:88%" |January 28, 2017 
|style="font-size:88%" |Golden Grand Prix Ivan Yarygin 2017
|style="text-align:left;font-size:88%;" |
 Krasnoyarsk, Russia
|-
! style=background:white colspan=7 |
|-
|Win
|40–14
|align=left| Parviz Hadi
|style="font-size:88%"|3–2
|style="font-size:88%" rowspan=4|November 30 – December 1, 2016 
|style="font-size:88%" rowspan=4|2016 World Clubs Cup
|style="text-align:left;font-size:88%;" rowspan=4|
 Kharkov, Ukraine
|-
|Loss
|39–14
|align=left| Alen Zasyeyev
|style="font-size:88%"|2–4
|-
|Loss
|39–13
|align=left| Giorgi Meshvildishvili
|style="font-size:88%"|2–5
|-
|Win
|39–12
|align=left| Oleksandr Khotsianivskiy
|style="font-size:88%"|2–1
|-
! style=background:white colspan=7 |
|-
|Loss
|38–12
|align=left| Batraz Gazzaev
|style="font-size:88%"|1–2
|style="font-size:88%" rowspan=4|October 14–16, 2016
|style="font-size:88%" rowspan=4|2016 Intercontinental Cup
|style="text-align:left;font-size:88%;" rowspan=4|
 Khasavyurt, Russia
|-
|Win
|38–11
|align=left| Anzor Khizriev
|style="font-size:88%"|5–1
|-
|Win
|37–11
|align=left| Umar Israilov
|style="font-size:88%"|9–1
|-
|Win
|36–11
|align=left| Dmitry Popov
|style="font-size:88%"|3–2
|-
! style=background:white colspan=7 |
|-
|Win
|35–11
|align=left| Oleksandr Khotsianivskyi
|style="font-size:88%"|5–0
|style="font-size:88%" rowspan=3|June 17–19, 2016
|style="font-size:88%" rowspan=3|2016 Ziolkowski International
|style="text-align:left;font-size:88%;" rowspan=3|
 Spala, Poland
|-
|Win
|34–11
|align=left| Diaaeldin Kamal 
|style="font-size:88%"|5–0
|-
|Loss
|33–11
|align=left| Mukhamagazi Magomedov
|style="font-size:88%"|7–8
|-
! style=background:white colspan=7 |
|-
|Win
|33–10
|align=left| Tanner Hall
|style="font-size:88%"|4–1
|style="font-size:88%" rowspan=7|June 2–6, 2016
|style="font-size:88%" rowspan=7|2016 US University National Championships
|style="text-align:left;font-size:88%;" rowspan=7|
 Akron, Ohio
|-
|Win
|32–10
|align=left| Tanner Hall
|style="font-size:88%"|3–1
|-
|Win
|31–10
|align=left| Garrett Ryan
|style="font-size:88%"|TF 10–0
|-
|Win
|30–10
|align=left| Nolan Terrance
|style="font-size:88%"|TF 12–2
|-
|Win
|29–10
|align=left| Ben Tynan
|style="font-size:88%"|TF 10–0
|-
|Win
|28–10
|align=left| Billy Miller 
|style="font-size:88%"|TF 10–0
|-
|Win
|27–10
|align=left| Louie Maser
|style="font-size:88%"|TF 10–0
|-
! style=background:white colspan=7 |
|-
|Loss
|26–10
|align=left| Dom Bradley
|style="font-size:88%"|2–2
|style="font-size:88%" rowspan=4|April 9, 2016
|style="font-size:88%" rowspan=4|2016 US Olympic Team Trials
|style="text-align:left;font-size:88%;" rowspan=4|
 Iowa City, Iowa
|-
|Win
|26–9
|align=left| Bobby Telford
|style="font-size:88%"|5–0
|-
|Loss
|25–9
|align=left| Zach Rey 
|style="font-size:88%"|2–4
|-
|Win
|25–8
|align=left| Justin Grant
|style="font-size:88%"|4–1
|-
! style=background:white colspan=7 |
|-
|Win
|24–8
|align=left| Dom Bradley
|style="font-size:88%"|1–0
|style="font-size:88%" rowspan=4|November 5–7, 2015
|style="font-size:88%" rowspan=4|2015 Bill Farrell Memorial International
|style="text-align:left;font-size:88%;" rowspan=4|
 New York, New York
|-
|Win
|23–8
|align=left| Anthony Nelson
|style="font-size:88%"|TF 11–0
|-
|Win
|22–8
|align=left| Pavel Krivtsov 
|style="font-size:88%"|11–6
|-
|Win
|21–8
|align=left| Justin Grant
|style="font-size:88%"|4–2
|-
! style=background:white colspan=7 |
|-
|Win
|20–8
|align=left| Deng Zhiwei
|style="font-size:88%"|Fall
|style="font-size:88%" rowspan=4|July 11, 2015
|style="font-size:88%" rowspan=4|2015 Grand Prix of Spain
|style="text-align:left;font-size:88%;" rowspan=4|
 Madrid, Spain
|-
|Win
|19–8
|align=left| Mehdi Gonbadani
|style="font-size:88%"|TF 14–4
|-
|Win
|18–8
|align=left| Kamil Kosciolek 
|style="font-size:88%"|TF 10–0
|-
|Win
|17–8
|align=left| Jose Cuba
|style="font-size:88%"|TF 10–0
|-
! style=background:white colspan=7 |
|-
|Loss
|16–8
|align=left| Dom Bradley
|style="font-size:88%"|1–2
|style="font-size:88%" rowspan=5|June 12–14, 2015
|style="font-size:88%" rowspan=5|2015 US World Team Trials
|style="text-align:left;font-size:88%;" rowspan=5|
 Madison, Wisconsin
|-
|Win
|16–7
|align=left| Tyrell Fortune
|style="font-size:88%"|5–0
|-
|Win
|15–7
|align=left| Adam Coon
|style="font-size:88%"|TF 12–2
|-
|Loss
|14–7
|align=left| Zach Rey
|style="font-size:88%"|1–7
|-
|Win
|14–6
|align=left| Connor Medbery
|style="font-size:88%"|6–4
|-
! style=background:white colspan=7 |
|-
|Win
|13–6
|align=left| Chadwick Hanke
|style="font-size:88%"|Fall
|style="font-size:88%" rowspan=4|May 7–9, 2015
|style="font-size:88%" rowspan=4|2015 US National Championships
|style="text-align:left;font-size:88%;" rowspan=4|
 Las Vegas, Nevada
|-
|Loss
|12–6
|align=left| Tervel Dlagnev
|style="font-size:88%"|2–8
|-
|Win
|12–5
|align=left| Dom Bradley
|style="font-size:88%"|4–4
|-
|Win
|11–5
|align=left| Michael Graves
|style="font-size:88%"|TF 10–0
|-
! style=background:white colspan=7 |
|-
|Loss
|10–5
|align=left| Tyrell Fortune
|style="font-size:88%"|TF 0–10
|style="font-size:88%" rowspan=4|May 29 – June 1, 2014
|style="font-size:88%" rowspan=4|2014 US World Team Trials
|style="text-align:left;font-size:88%;" rowspan=4|
 Madison, Wisconsin
|-
|Loss
|10–4
|align=left| Zach Rey
|style="font-size:88%"|3–9
|-
|Win
|10–3
|align=left| Dom Bradley
|style="font-size:88%"|9–9
|-
|Win
|9–3
|align=left| Jarod Trice
|style="font-size:88%"|4–4
|-
! style=background:white colspan=7 |
|-
|Win
|8–3
|align=left| Austin Marsden
|style="font-size:88%"|7–5
|style="font-size:88%" rowspan=6|May 24–26, 2013
|style="font-size:88%" rowspan=6|2013 US University National Championships
|style="text-align:left;font-size:88%;" rowspan=6|
 Akron, Ohio
|-
|Win
|7–3
|align=left| Connor Medbery
|style="font-size:88%"|10–8
|-
|Loss
|6–3
|align=left| Tyrell Fortune
|style="font-size:88%"|0–8
|-
|Win
|6–2
|align=left| Michael Kroells
|style="font-size:88%"|TF 16–4
|-
|Win
|5–2
|align=left| Connor Medbery
|style="font-size:88%"|12–9
|-
|Win
|4–2
|align=left| Jeremy Johnson
|style="font-size:88%"|14–9
|-
! style=background:white colspan=7 |
|-
|Win
|3–2
|align=left| Jeremy Johnson
|style="font-size:88%"|3–1, 4–0
|style="font-size:88%" rowspan=5|April 17–20, 2013
|style="font-size:88%" rowspan=5|2013 US Open National Championships
|style="text-align:left;font-size:88%;" rowspan=5|
 Las Vegas, Nevada
|-
|Loss
|2–2
|align=left| Tyrell Fortune
|style="font-size:88%"|2–4, 3–5
|-
|Win
|2–1
|align=left| Riley Orozco
|style="font-size:88%"|4–3, 3–0
|-
|Loss
|1–1
|align=left| Dom Bradley
|style="font-size:88%"|0–3, 0–2
|-
|Win
|1–0
|align=left| David Lopez
|style="font-size:88%"|8–3, 6–0
|-

References

External links 
 
 Nick Gwiazdowski's Rokfin Channel

1992 births
Living people
American male sport wrestlers
World Wrestling Championships medalists
Pan American Games medalists in wrestling
Pan American Games gold medalists for the United States
Wrestlers at the 2019 Pan American Games
Medalists at the 2019 Pan American Games